Caoling is a rural village in Gukeng Township, Yunlin County, Taiwan. The area measures approximately one thousand hectares.

Mountains around Caoling are prone to landslides, and four barrier lakes have formed around the area. The most recent one, New Caoling Lake, existed between 1999 and 2004.

Transportation
Caoling is located on County Route 149 and accessible by bus from Douliu Station of the Taiwan Railways Administration.

References

External links
 草嶺地質公園資訊網 
 Caoling on OSM

Geography of Yunlin County
Villages in Taiwan